The Marruá ("Wild Bull") is a family of four-by-four wheeled transport and utility vehicles, built by Agrale in Caxias do Sul, Rio Grande do Sul, Brazil. Developed in the early 2000s to serve as a replacement for ageing jeeps and other vehicles in Brazilian service (Bandeirante and JPX), it has also been adopted by several other South American armies, and is used on peacekeeping missions with the United Nations in Haiti.

Design
Following the bankruptcy of Engesa in early 1990, former employees of the company acquired the rights to the Engesa EE-4/EE-12 utility vehicle, and, working with the Agrale company, developed an improved version of the vehicle between 2003 and 2005 to meet a specification for a 1/2 ton, 4x4 Viatura de Transporte Não Especializada (Non-Specialised Transport Vehicle, VTNE) for the Armed Forces of Brazil, to replace the Jeeps previously in service. Three prototypes were constructed for testing by the Brazilian Army, with Agrale investing $11 million into the project, and the Marruá was accepted for Brazilian service on 27 July 2005.

Models
Current models of the Marruá are:

Military versions

Military 4x4's featuring MWM motors meeting Euro III standards.
 Agrale Marruá AM2 VTNE ½ Ton (base four person two door Jeep-like vehicle with removable roof)
 AM2 MB-NET is a specialised version for the Brazilian Marine Corps, with rust-resistant paint, high-flotation tires, and seating for six.
 Agrale Marruá AM11/AM11 REC/VTNE/VTL REC (five person four door Jeep-like vehicle with removable roof)
 Agrale Marruá AM20-VDC, a command and control vehicle.
 Agrale Marruá AM20 and AM21 - Amb (ambulance for transporting wounded and may be single or removal of ICU equipment)
 Agrale Marruá AM20 and AM21 - VCC (Special Car for command and control operations)
 Agrale Marruá AM21 - VTNE ¾ Ton (pickup truck for personal transport or load 750 kg load with removable hood, metallic body with vinyl roof)
 Agrale Marruá AM23 - VTNE ¾ Ton
 Agrale Marruá AM23 CC/CDCC - VTNE ¾ Ton
 Agrale Marruá AM31 - VTNE 1½ Ton (pickup truck)
 Agrale Marruá AM41 - VTNE 2½ Ton (cabover tactical truck)

Civil versions

 Civil 4x4's feature Cummins ISF 2.8 turbodiesels  meeting Euro V standards with enclosed cabs
 Agrale Marruá AM200 G2 CD (Cabine Dupla) - Double Cab Pickup
 Agrale Marruá AM200 G2 CS (Cabine Simples) - Single Cab Pickup
 Agrale Marruá AM300 G2 CC (Chassi-Cabine)- Chassis cab

Former Versions
 Agrale Marruá AM50 Trabalhando - civil version of the VTNE
 Agrale Marruá AM100 Trabalhando - first pickup version based on VTNE platform
 Agrale Marruá AM150 - Agrale Marruá AM11/AM11 REC/VTNE/VTL REC based Double Cab Pickup/Chassis cab

Operational history
The Marruá has entered service with both the Brazilian Army and the Brazilian Marine Corps, in addition to being acquired by the armies of Ecuador and Argentina, the latter using eighteen vehicles as part of the United Nations Peacekeeping Mission in Haiti starting in 2009.

Operators

 Argentine Army  Argentine Air Force  Argentine Marines Argentine National Gendarmerie
 Brazilian ArmyBrazilian NavyBrazilian Air ForceBrazilian Marine CorpsMilitary Police
 Ecuadorian Army
 Ghana Armed Forces
 Namibian Defence ForceNamibian ArmyNamibian Special Forces
 Paraguayan Army
 Peruvian Army
 Army of Suriname
 United Arab Emirates Armed Forces
  Army of Uganda

Specifications
from

Dimensions 
Length: 
Overall Height: 
Height with windshield folded: 
Width: 
Capacity: 4-6 soldiers

Weights 
Weight in running order: 
Gross weight:

Performance 
Maximum speed: 
Minimum sustainable speed: 
Maximum incline: 60%
Maximum lateral incline: 30%
Ford depth without snorkel: 
Ground clearance: 
Approach angle: 64°
Departure angle: 52°
Maximum payload:  +  trailer
Fuel capacity: 
Range:  (on road)

Transmission 
Model: Eaton FS 2305, mechanical
Gears: 5 forward gears and 1 reverse

Engine 
Brand / Model: MWM 4.07TCA SPRINT-EII turbodiesel, 2.8-liter four-cylinder inline, water cooled
Power:  at 3,600 rpm
Torque: 340 Nm at 1,800 rpm

References

External links

 

Military equipment of Brazil
Cars of Brazil
Military light utility vehicles
Military trucks
Military vehicles introduced in the 2000s